aka The Three Patriots of Edo is a 1928 black-and-white silent Japanese film directed by .

References

External links 
 
 

Japanese silent films
Japanese black-and-white films
1928 films
Nikkatsu films